The Speed of Now World Tour was the thirteenth headlining concert tour by New Zealand-born Australian country music artist Keith Urban. The tour is in support of his eleventh studio album, The Speed of Now Part 1 (2020). It began on 28 April 2022, in Birmingham, England and is scheduled to finish on 17 December 2022 in Melbourne, Australia.

Background
The tour was first announced in December 2021. He will first take the tour to Europe followed by North America, and then finish out the year in his homeland of Australia.

Show synopsis
The show begins with Urban's 2004 hit "Days Go By". The two hour set includes Urban playing his greatest hits, his latest singles, "Wild Hearts" and "Nightfalls". While performing "One Too Many", his 2020 collaboration with American singer, P!nk, a giant projection of her is shown on the video screens. He finishes the show with "Stupid Boy".

Critical reception
Laura Cooney of Entertainment Focus, attended the 6 May London show and was all positive and praised his versatility. Cooney also said, "Even after 20 years in the business, it's clear Keith Urban is an artist at the top of his game and has a really strong sense of love for the UK audience – and that feel is mutual. He put together a masterclass of a show featuring all his top tracks, showing off his incredible skills as a guitar player and tremendous crowd engagement throughout, which all made for a fantastic night out." Khyle Medany from the Purple Revolver gave the Manchester show a 4.5 out of 5 rating. He said, "The O2 Apollo was Keith's stage on this night, for an intimate yet powerful, moving night of grooves, country jams and plentiful hits."

Opening acts
Ingrid Andress 
Tyler Hubbard

Setlist
This setlist is a representation of the 6 May 2022, London show.
 "Days Go By"
 "Wild Hearts"
 "The Fighter"
 "Long Hot Summer"
 "Parallel Line"
 "Never Comin' Down"
 "Somewhere in My Car"
 "Nightfalls"
 "John Cougar, John Deere, John 3:16"
 "Superman"
 "God Whispered Your Name"
 "One Too Many"
 "Easy on Me" 
 "You'll Think of Me"
 "Somebody Like You"
 "The Lion Sleeps Tonight" 
 "Blue Ain't Your Color"
 "The Fighter"
Encore
 "Wasted Time"
 "Stupid Boy"

Tour dates

References

2022 concert tours
Keith Urban concert tours